Hendrik Nikolai Blignaut (born 1 October 1985 in East London, South Africa) is a rugby union player for club side College Rovers.

External links

Sharks profile

1985 births
Living people
South African rugby union players
Sharks (rugby union) players
Rugby union flankers
Rugby union players from East London, Eastern Cape